Daniel Greco Costa (born 7 April 1989) is a British-Italian-Portuguese pianist and composer, known for his original work and for his collaborations with artists such as Randy Brecker, John Patitucci, Mike Stern, Hermeto Pascoal,  Dave Liebman, Ivan Lins, Seamus Blake, Dave Douglas, Romero Lubambo, Leila Pinheiro,  Marcos Suzano, Jaques Morelenbaum and Roberto Menescal. His music has been featured by publications such as DownBeat and Rolling Stone.

Education
Costa was born in London, England, to Italian and Portuguese parents, with roots in Sorrento and Porto. He studied classical piano as well as jazz piano at the Académie de Musique Rainier III for six years prior to taking a diploma at Sir Paul McCartney's Liverpool Institute for Performing Arts. He then focused on jazz at the Escola Superior de Música, Artes e Espetáculo in Portugal, graduating with distinction and a Rotary Club Award for outstanding achievement. During his course, he was also awarded a grant to study Brazilian music at UNICAMP in São Paulo, Brazil as an international exchange student. He pursued further studies at Berklee College of Music.

Career
Costa's career took off when he recorded his debut album Suite Três Rios in Rio de Janeiro, Brazil, considered one of the best albums of 2016 by DownBeat. Dubbed "a finely crafted album" by critic Carlo Wolff, it was amongst the best-selling albums on the iTunes Portugal Chart and peaked at number 5 on the Roots Music Report Jazz Chart in the United States. The track "Bossa Nova (feat. Leila Pinheiro)" was Top 10 on the Jazz Song Chart. He worked with Jaques Morelenbaum, Leila Pinheiro, Marcos Suzano, Ricardo Silveira, Rafael Barata and Jan Erik Kongshaug, amongst others.

He recorded his new album Skyness, at Arte Suono, Italy, in 2018, with Nelson Faria, Roberto Menescal, Romero Lubambo, Seamus Blake, Custodio Castelo, Jorge Helder and Teco Cardoso. Described as "rare and luxurious" by All About Jazz, it was released at the Blue Note in Rio de Janeiro and featured in a documentary by Radio Monte-Carlo in Milan, Italy. The track "Compelling" was featured by Jazziz Magazine in their Summer Breezin' 2019 compilation, while Raul da Gama from World Music Report considered him “deeply gifted”. 

He performed in Italy, Portugal, Cyprus, Brazil, Malta, Spain, Turkey, Greece, Armenia, Lebanon and Egypt, where he was featured by Al-Arab, which considered his music a message of love and intercultural communication. He also toured India, where he was featured and interviewed by Rolling Stone, as well as by India Today. He also did masterclasses hosted by schools such as the Global Music Institute.

In 2020 Costa recorded Love Dance in Lisbon with one of the song's creators, Ivan Lins. Jazziz Magazine wrote “the song is something of a modern standard, with definitive versions recorded by George Benson and Sarah Vaughan; this take surely belongs beside them”. Costa was also interviewed by Rádio e Televisão de Portugal with Bossa Nova legend Roberto Menescal, where they talked about their collaboration and the origins of the Brazilian style. He released his first solo piano album, Live in California, which came in second on Roots Music Report's Top Latin Jazz Album for the year of 2020 Chart and was praised for "profound expression" by Jazziz Magazine. 

In 2022, he released Iremia with Randy Brecker, as a message of peace. He also recorded his new album Beams in New York City with John Patitucci, Mike Stern, Dave Douglas, Hermeto Pascoal, Dave Liebman and other musicians.  In an interview for Musica Jazz Costa talked about nature as a major source of interpretation, the use of harmonic colour to express life experiences and the concepts at the heart of the album. In the liner notes, Randy Brecker praises the interactions between the musicians and the intricacy of the compositions, concluding that the album consists of “heartfelt emotional music”. According to All About Jazz, the album displays "some of the best atmospheric jazz you are likely to hear in 2023. Or any year". Costa toured Europe, Southeast Asia, Australia and New Zealand, where he was featured by Otago Daily Times and did masterclasses at universities such as Mahidol University, Monash University, Australian National University and Victoria University of Wellington.

Personal life

Costa has lived in eight countries and speaks eight languages.

Discography
Suite Três Rios – 2016
Skyness – 2018
Love Dance with Ivan Lins - 2020
Live in California - 2020
Iremia with Randy Brecker - 2022
Beams - 2023

References

1989 births
Living people
British jazz pianists
British jazz composers
21st-century pianists
Musicians from London